The Group of Eight (Go8) comprises Australia's most research intensive universities (in alphabetical order) - the University of Adelaide, the Australian National University, the University of Melbourne, Monash University, UNSW Sydney, the University of Queensland, the University of Sydney and the University of Western Australia. It is often compared to the Russell Group of pioneering research universities in the United Kingdom.

The Go8 universities are some of the largest and the oldest universities in Australia and are consistently the highest ranked of all Australian universities. Seven of the Go8 members are ranked in the world's top 100 universities and all Go8 members are ranked in the world's top 150 universities; in the Academic Ranking of World Universities (ARWU), the Times Higher Education World University Rankings (THES), the QS World University Rankings (QS) and the U.S. News & World Report (US News). Go8 Universities feature in the top 50 for every broad subject area in the QS world university subject rankings. In addition, all Go8 Universities are in the QS top 100 for Engineering and Technology, Life Sciences and Medicine, Arts and Humanities, and Social Sciences and Management.

The Go8 educates 425,000 students; educating more than one quarter of all higher education students in Australia. It graduates some 110,000 quality graduates each year.

The Go8 undertakes 70 per cent of Australia's university research and their research funding from industry and other non-Government sources is twice that of the rest of the sector combined.

The Go8 receives 71 per cent of Australian Competitive Grant (Category 1) funding and had the largest proportion of research fields rated at 4 or 5 (‘above’ or ‘well above’ world standard) in the latest Excellence in Research for Australia (ERA) exercise, with 99 per cent of Go8 research is world class or above. Each year the Go8 spends some $6.5 billion on research – more than $2.4 billion of which is spent on Medical and Health Services research. Go8 universities educate more than half of Australia's doctors, dentists, vets and provide some 54 per cent of Australia's science graduates and more than 40 per cent of Australia's engineering graduates.

The Go8 Board, which consists of the vice-chancellors (who also serve as principals or presidents) of its eight member universities, meets five times a year. The current Chair of the Board is Margaret Gardner, Vice-Chancellor of Monash University. Vicki Thomson is the Chief Executive of the Group of Eight, taking up the role in January 2015.

Members 

Equals signs (=) denote tied rankings.

Map

Go8 law schools

Summary of schools

See also
 Association of American Universities
 Australian Technology Network
 C9 League
 Golden triangle (universities)
 Imperial Universities
 Innovative Research Universities
 Ivy League
 Law schools in Australia
 Universities in Australia
 Regional Universities Network
 Russel Group
 SKY (universities)

Notes

References

External links 
 Group of Eight official website

 
College and university associations and consortia in Australia